Layneker Evelio Zafra Martínez (born May 23, 1986 in San Cristóbal), known as Layneker Zafra or simply Zafra, is a Venezuelan footballer who plays as defender at Deportivo Táchira.

References

External links

 at BDFA.com.ar

1986 births
Living people
Association football defenders
Venezuelan footballers
Venezuelan expatriate footballers
Venezuelan Primera División players
Deportivo Táchira F.C. players
UA Maracaibo players
Zamora FC players
Atlético Venezuela C.F. players
América de Cali footballers
Carabobo F.C. players
Atlético Huila footballers
Cortuluá footballers
Monagas S.C. players
Expatriate footballers in Colombia
People from San Cristóbal, Táchira